Alexander Adamson (21 June 1921 – 3 September 1983) was Provost of St Andrew's Cathedral, Aberdeen from 1978 to 1983.

When peace returned he worked for the National Assistance Board. He studied for the priesthood at Lichfield Theological College and was ordained in 1959. After a curacy in Pontefract he was Vicar of Honley with Brockholes from 1962 to 1969; Rector of St John the Evangelist, Aberdeen from 1969 to 1978.

References

1921 births
1983 deaths
Deans of Aberdeen and Orkney
Alumni of Ely Theological College
20th-century Scottish Episcopalian priests
Royal Air Force personnel of World War II